Gjerdinghøi is a mountain in Lom Municipality in Innlandet county, Norway. The mountain is surrounded by several other notable mountains including Kjølen, Søre Kjølhaugen, and Knatthøin to the north; Ryggehøi, Skardtind, Rundkollan, and Storbrettingskollen to the northwest; and Lauvknubben to the west.

See also
List of mountains of Norway

References

Lom, Norway
Mountains of Innlandet